Cherokee is an unincorporated community and census-designated place in Butte County, California. It is an area inhabited by Maidu Indians prior to the gold rush, but that takes its name from a band of Cherokee prospectors who perfected a mining claim on the site. The population was 69 at the 2010 census. It lies at an elevation of 1306 feet (398 m).

Possibly the site of the historic gold mine, on the 1994 Cherokee, California 7.5-minute quadrangle, a feature named "Cherokee Placer Mine" exists about 0.65 miles southwest of the above coordinates. USGS identifies Cherokee Flat and Drytown as historic variant names for the community. The town is located on Cherokee Road off State Route 70.

Today, Cherokee now consists of a museum and a Cherokee cemetery, as well as a few houses. The Cherokee Heritage and Museum Association maintains both.

The ZIP Code is 95965. The community is inside area code 530.

History
Cherokee is within the traditional territory of the Maidu. Around 1818 Spanish explorers found gold on Cherokee's south side near Table Mountain. In 1849 Cherokee came from Oklahoma. Welsh miners came in the 1850s, naming the town after the Cherokee and constructing many buildings in town.

Thomas Edison owned one of the mines which sprung up in the area, and he saw to it that the mines were electrified to ease the work. The town prospered during the mining period, and Butte County's first homes with running water were built in Cherokee.

In 1880 President Rutherford B. Hayes, his wife Lucy, Civil War General William T. Sherman and General John Bidwell came to visit Cherokee's famous hydraulic gold mine. In the 1890s, the gold mines were sold off because of operational costs. At its boomtime, the town had a population in the thousands.

A post office operated at Cherokee from 1854 to 1912.

Spring Valley Mine

Over time, mines consolidated and by 1870, Cherokee's hydraulic-mining ventures were consolidated into a single operation controlled by the Spring Valley Mining and Irrigation Company.  The mine closed in 1894. Still existing in the area are Spring Valley Elementary School, Spring Valley Reservoir, and Spring Valley Gulch (an actual valley)

Cherokee as a tourist attraction
Visitors come to Cherokee to see the museum and the cemetery, and for its two annual festivals, on July 4 and on a weekend near September 24, which is called President Hayes Day.

In the vicinity are Sugarloaf, a nearby promontory which is home to deer, foxes, doves, peacocks and hiking trails. Table Mountain is famous for its springtime wildflowers.

A Chinese Taoist temple, one of America's oldest Taoist establishments (no longer in use), built in the 1860s by the town's small Chinese community, was made a state historic site.

Demographics

The 2010 United States Census reported that Cherokee had a population of 69. The racial makeup of Cherokee was 48 (70%) White, 0 African American, 2 (3%) Native American, 8 (12%) Asian, 0 Pacific Islander, 0 from other races, and 11 (16%) from two or more races. Hispanic or Latino of any race were 1 persons (1%).

The Census reported that 69 people (100% of the population) lived in households, 0 lived in non-institutionalized group quarters, and 0 were institutionalized.

There were 26 households, out of which 7 (27%) had children under the age of 18 living in them, 14 (54%) were opposite-sex married couples living together, 3 (12%) had a female householder with no husband present, 1 (4%) had a male householder with no wife present. There were 2 (8%) unmarried opposite-sex partnerships, and 0 same-sex married couples or partnerships. 7 households (27%) were made up of individuals, and 4 (15%) had someone living alone who was 65 years of age or older. The average household size was 2.6. There were 18 families (69% of all households); the average family size was 3.3.

The population was spread out, with 16 people (23%) under the age of 18, 3 people (4%) aged 18 to 24, 19 people (28%) aged 25 to 44, 19 people (28%) aged 45 to 64, and 12 people (17%) who were 65 years of age or older.  The median age was 42.8 years. For every 100 females, there were 122.6 males. For every 100 females age 18 and over, there were 103.8 males.

There were 30 housing units at an average density of 15.6 per square mile (6.0/km2). The housing units included 19 (73%) owner-occupied, 7 (27%) occupied by renters, and 4 vacant. The homeowner vacancy rate was 0%; the rental vacancy rate was 0%. 50 people (73% of the population) lived in owner-occupied housing units and 19 people (28%) lived in rental housing units.

References

Kay Grant, The Remains Of Cherokee: A California Gold Rush Town, offbeattravel.com

External links

A page of images from Cherokee
"The ghosts of Cherokee: Digging up the history of a Butte County mining town" - Chico News & Review, published July 18, 2013
Cherokee, California at Western Mining History, 2020

Census-designated places in Butte County, California
Census-designated places in California
Museums in Butte County, California